Paul Antaki (January 16, 1927 in Cairo, Egypt - December 29, 2011) was the Melkite Greek Catholic titular archeparch of Nubia and auxiliary bishop.

Biography

Archbishop Paul Antaki was born in Cairo on January 16, 1927. Having obtained both French and Egyptian baccalaureates, he studied theology at the Seminary of St. Anne of Jerusalem from 1946 to 1951. Ordained on July 2, 1950, he was appointed parish priest in Alexandria from 1951 to 1954, then Superior of the Patriarchal College in Cairo, 1954-1957, Secretary of the Patriarchate of Alexandria from 1957 to 1960 and Vicar of Alexandria from 1960 to 1966. In 1966 he was appointed Superior of the Minor Seminary of Rayak, a position he held until his episcopal ordination.

On September 9, 1968, he was appointed Titular Archbishop of Nubia and appointed auxiliary bishop in the Melkite Patriarchate of Antioch. The consecration took place on 1 December 1968 in the Cathedral of Beirut. His Consecrator was the patriarch of Antioch, Archbishop Maximos V Hakim. Co-consecrators were the Archbishops Elias Zoghby and Joseph Tawil. From 1968 to 2002 Antaki was also Patriarchal Vicar of Alexandria and then from 1991 to 2002 Patriarchal Exarch of Alexandria in Egypt and Sudan. In 1997 he was appointed to the Patriarch of Antioch and Syncellus. On 21 June 2001, by Pope John Paul II, when his age-related withdrawal from the episcopate was accepted.

He was a member of the Episcopal Conference of Egypt and chairman of the Youth Commission. During his tenure as auxiliary bishop he consecrated in 1973 Georges Bakar a priest and was at his episcopal ordination as Titular Archbishop of Pelusium of Greek Melkites (Apostolic Exarch of Jerusalem). He was also co-consecrator of his successor as Patriarchal Vicar of Alexandria Joseph Jules Zerey who is Titular Archbishop of Damietta of Greek Melkites (Auxiliary Bishop of Antioch).

He served as Protosyncellus and Patriarchal Exarch of the Melkite Patriarch in Egypt and the Sudan from 9 September 1968 to 22 June 2001.

Notes

External links
 https://web.archive.org/web/20190119044736/http://www.apostolische-nachfolge.de/afrika.htm
 https://web.archive.org/web/20080828052351/http://www.melkites.org/en/ea.php

1927 births
2011 deaths
Melkite Greek Catholic bishops
Clergy from Cairo
Egyptian Melkite Greek Catholics
20th-century Roman Catholic titular archbishops
Egyptian expatriates in Israel
Eastern Catholic bishops in Africa